Jermale Hines (born November 11, 1987) is a former American football safety. He was drafted by the St. Louis Rams in the fifth round of the 2011 NFL Draft. He played college football at Ohio State. He has also been a member of the Carolina Panthers.

College career
Hines was a 2010 First-team All-Big Ten selection as a strong safety after playing free safety in 2009. He ended his career with 28 starts, 155  tackles.  In 2009 Hines was a starter at free safety and was fourth on the squad with 57 tackles. In 2008, he played safety and made 31 tackles for the year. In 2007, he played on special teams as a true freshman.

Professional career

St. Louis Rams
Hines was drafted with the 158th pick in the 2011 NFL Draft by the St. Louis Rams. He was waived on September 27.

Indianapolis Colts
On September 28, the Indianapolis Colts claimed him off of waivers, but was waived on October 3.

Carolina Panthers
Hines was claimed off waivers by the Carolina Panthers on October 4. He was waived on November 15. On Oct 18th he was signed to the Carolina Practice Squad.

Second stint with Colts
Hines was signed by the Colts on November 30, 2011. On September 1, 2012 Hines was cut by the Colts.

References

External links
Ohio State Buckeyes bio

1987 births
Living people
Ohio State Buckeyes football players
American football safeties
Players of American football from Cleveland
St. Louis Rams players
Indianapolis Colts players
Carolina Panthers players